During the 2005–06 English football season, Oldham Athletic competed in Football League One where they finished in 10th position with 65 points.

Final league table

Results
Oldham Athletic's score comes first

Legend

Football League One

FA Cup

League Cup

Football League Trophy

Squad statistics

References
General
Oldham Athletic 2005–06 at soccerbase.com (use drop down list to select relevant season)

Specific

2005-06
Oldham Athletic